Saigon Eclipse  (Sài Gòn nhật thực) is a 2007 Vietnamese film directed by Othello Khanh and starring Dustin Nguyen, Johnny Trí Nguyễn, Như Quỳnh, Daniel You, Edmund Chen, and Joseph Chen Tseng. It is based on Nguyễn Du's epic poem, The Tale of Kiều.

Plot
The story relates the destiny of a young, beautiful and talented Vietnamese woman who sacrifices herself for her family. The film chronicles the fate of Kieu, a beautiful young girl, who soon after her secret engagement, returns home to find her father is about to be imprisoned on trumped-up charges. Kieu offers herself in payment for her father's debt without fully understanding the ramifications of the decision. Du's poem was written as an allegory for Vietnam, which has often been possessed and abused by others.

References

External links
 
 

2007 films
Films shot in Vietnam
Vietnamese-language films
2007 thriller films
2007 in Vietnam
Vietnamese thriller films
2000s English-language films